Marcel Delaître (1888–1963) was a French film and stage actor.

Selected filmography

 Happy Hearts (1932)
 Poliche (1934)
 Street Without a Name (1934)
 Crime and Punishment (1935)
 Girls of Paris (1936)
 The Gardens of Murcia (1936)
 Return at Dawn (1938)
 Women's Prison (1938)
 The Puritan (1938)
 J'accuse! (1938)
 Immediate Call (1939)
 Paradise Lost (1940)
 Strange Suzy (1941)
 Le Corbeau (1943)
 First on the Rope (1944)
 Father Goriot (1945)
 The Eleventh Hour Guest (1945)
 Night Warning (1946)
 The Queen's Necklace (1946)
 Special Mission (1946)
 Raboliot (1946)
 The Lost Village (1947)
 Du Guesclin (1948)
 The Secret of Monte Cristo (1948)
 Rocambole (1948)
 The Revenge of Baccarat (1948)
 The King (1949)
 God Needs Men (1950)
 Maria of the End of the World (1951)
 Mammy (1951)
 Alone in the World (1952)
 When You Read This Letter (1953)

References

Bibliography
 Crisp, Colin. French Cinema—A Critical Filmography: Volume 2, 1940–1958. Indiana University Press, 2015.

External links

1888 births
1963 deaths
French male film actors
French male stage actors
Male actors from Paris